Novosibirsk Chocolate Factory is a factory in Oktyabrsky District of Novosibirsk. It was founded in 1942. The factory is part of the United Confectioners Holding.

History
The factory was created on the basis of evacuated department of Odessa Confectionery Factory in 1942.

Products
The Factory produces chocolate, marmalade, zefir (more than 80 kinds of products).

Net profit
 2016 – 17,4 million rubles
 2017 – 90,8 million rubles

Bibliography

References

Manufacturing companies based in Novosibirsk
Oktyabrsky District, Novosibirsk
United Confectioners
Food and drink companies established in 1942
Food and drink companies of the Soviet Union
Chocolate factories
1942 establishments in the Soviet Union